Sudhansu Jyoti Mukhopadhaya was a justice of the Supreme Court of India. He then headed the National Company Law Appellate Tribunal as Chairperson from  1 June 2016 to 14 March 2020. He previously served as Chief Justice of Gujarat High Court and also served as acting Chief Justice at the Jharkhand High Court and at Madras High Court.

Notable judgements

Suresh Kumar Koushal v. Naz Foundation

A Supreme Court bench of justice GS Singhvi and justice SJ Mukhopadhaya has upheld the Section 377 of India's penal code bans "sex against the order of nature", which is widely interpreted to mean homosexual sex. The judges stated that "a minuscule fraction of the country's population constitutes lesbians, gays, bisexuals or transgenders" and that the High Court had erroneously relied upon international precedents "in its anxiety to protect the so-called rights of LGBT persons". The United Nations human rights chief Navi Pillay voiced her disappointment at the re-criminalization of consensual same-sex relationships in India, calling it "a significant step backwards" for the country and UN chief Ban Ki-moon stressed the need for equality and opposed any discrimination against lesbians, gays and bisexuals. The decision is widely believed to be one of the lowest points of Indian Supreme Court jurisprudence.

The judgement was overturned by a larger constitutional bench on 6 September 2018 in Navtej Singh Johar v. Union of India case.

References 

1950 births
Living people
Justices of the Supreme Court of India
Chief Justices of the Gujarat High Court
Judges of the Jharkhand High Court
Judges of the Madras High Court
20th-century Indian judges
21st-century Indian judges